This is a list of the National Register of Historic Places listings in Brewster County, Texas

This is intended to be a complete list of properties and districts listed on the National Register of Historic Places in Brewster County, Texas. There are seven districts and five individual properties listed on the National Register in the county. Two sites are also listed as Recorded Texas Historic Landmarks including one that is a State Antiquities Landmark.

Current listings

The publicly disclosed locations of National Register properties and districts may be seen in a mapping service provided.

|}

See also

National Register of Historic Places listings in Texas
Recorded Texas Historic Landmarks in Brewster County

References

External links

Registered Historic Places
Brewster County
Buildings and structures in Brewster County, Texas